Bargajwa is a village in West Champaran district in the Indian state of Bihar.

Demographics
 India census, Bargajwa had a population of 1266 in 214 households. Males constitute 51.42% of the population and females 48.57%. Bargajwa has an average literacy rate of 53%, lower than the national average of 74%: male literacy is 63.18%, and female literacy is 36.81%. In Bargajwa, 20% of the population is under 6 years of age.

References

Villages in West Champaran district